Tom Langford is an American alternative rock/folk singer and songwriter.  Paste magazine described his music as "somewhere between Nick Drake's fragile beauty and Leonard Cohen's wry, literary folk."

Biography

Langford first realised his love of song-writing in 1990, having lived in Italy and France for a year beforehand.  Initially he busked and played in cafés and bars in Europe.  Whilst hitch-hiking, the driver who picked him up happened to his guitar, and dropped him at a house occupied by five other musicians.  Within a few days of living with them, playing music all day, he knew that this was his calling.

When he returned to the United States, he played gigs around the Los Angeles area, but his touring expanded to other parts of California.

XM Satellite Radio named him the Best New Acoustic Rock Artist for 2005.
In 2006, Langford inked a deal with GoDigital Records, a subsidiary of the GoDigital Media Group for exclusive worldwide digital distribution.

Discography

Albums

External links
Tom Langford's Official Site

References

American male singer-songwriters
American singer-songwriters
Living people
Year of birth missing (living people)
Place of birth missing (living people)